The following lists events that happened during 2004 in the United Arab Emirates.

Incumbents
President: 
 until 2 November: Zayed bin Sultan Al Nahyan 
 2 November-3 November: Maktoum bin Rashid AL Maktoum (acting)
 starting 3 November: Khalifa bin Zayed Al Nahyan 
Prime Minister: Maktoum bin Rashid Al Maktoum

Events

January
 January 14 - A 45-year-old Sudanese man travelling from Washington Dulles International Airport to airport Dubai is arrested en route at London's Heathrow Airport on suspicion of carrying five bullets in his coat pocket.

February
 February 10 - At least 35 die when an Iranian airliner crashes on arrival at Sharjah airport.

Establishments
 British University in Dubai.

Deaths
 November 2 - Zayed bin Sultan Al Nahyan.

References

 
Years of the 21st century in the United Arab Emirates
United Arab Emirates
United Arab Emirates
2000s in the United Arab Emirates